Cody Ryan Thomas (born October 8, 1994) is an American professional baseball outfielder in the Oakland Athletics organization. He was a multi-sport athlete in college, playing both college baseball and college football at the University of Oklahoma.

Early years
Thomas attended Colleyville Heritage High School in Colleyville, Texas. In football, he passed for 3,057 yards with 32 touchdowns as a junior and 4,154 yards with 51 touchdowns as a senior. Thomas was rated as a four-star recruit and was ranked among the top quarterbacks in his class. He committed to the University of Oklahoma to play college football.

The New York Yankees selected Thomas in the 30th round of the 2013 Major League Baseball draft, but he did not sign.

College career

Football
Thomas took a redshirt in his first year with the Oklahoma Sooners football team in 2013. As a redshirt freshman in 2014, he appeared in seven games and made three starts. He completed 30-of-66 passes for 342 yards with two touchdowns and four interceptions. Thomas competed with Baker Mayfield and Trevor Knight for the starting job in 2015. Mayfield won the job with Thomas appearing in three games as a backup. In January 2016, he left the football team to focus on his baseball career.

Baseball
Thomas appeared in 14 games for the Oklahoma Sooners baseball team as freshman in 2014, recording one hit in 12 at-bats. He did not play in 2015 while focusing on football. He returned to baseball in 2016, appearing in 40 games. He hit .299/.354/.556 with six home runs and 27 runs batted in (RBI) over 117 at-bats.

Professional career

Los Angeles Dodgers
Thomas was selected by the Los Angeles Dodgers in the 13th round of the 2016 MLB Draft. He signed with the Dodgers and made his professional debut with the Arizona League Dodgers. After seven games he was promoted to the Ogden Raptors. Thomas was awarded the Joe Bauman Home Run Award for finishing the 2016 season with 19 home runs among short season A and rookie ball players. On August 3, 2017 Thomas set Great Lake Loons' single-game records in homers (3), RBIs (7) and total bases (12). In the same game, both Cody & teammate Carlos Rincon also hit back to back HR's twice in the same inning which has only been done one other time in the history of professional baseball (Boone/Cameron, Mariners 2002).

With the Rancho Cucamonga Quakes in 2018 he was named to the post-season California League All-Star team. In 127 games he hit .285 with 19 homers and 87 RBI. Thomas did not play in a game in 2020 due to the cancellation of the minor league season because of the COVID-19 pandemic.

Oakland Athletics
On February 12, 2021, he was traded to the Oakland Athletics along with Adam Kolarek in exchange for Sheldon Neuse and Gus Varland. Thomas spent the year with the Triple-A Las Vegas Aviators, slashing .289/.363/.665 with 18 home runs and 52 RBI in 59 games. He was added to the Athletics' 40-man roster on November 19, 2021. He was designated for assignment on December 16, 2022.

References

External links

Oklahoma Sooners baseball bio
Oklahoma Sooners football bio

1994 births
Living people
American football quarterbacks
Arizona Complex League Athletics players
Arizona League Dodgers players
Baseball players from Texas
Colleyville Heritage High School alumni
Glendale Desert Dogs players
Great Lakes Loons players
Las Vegas Aviators players
Major League Baseball outfielders
Oakland Athletics players
Ogden Raptors players
Oklahoma Sooners baseball players
Oklahoma Sooners football players
People from Colleyville, Texas
Players of American football from Texas
Rancho Cucamonga Quakes players
Tulsa Drillers players